Stephen Els (born 26 February 1934) is a South African former cricketer. He played in two first-class matches for Border in 1957/58 and 1959/60.

See also
 List of Border representative cricketers

References

External links
 

1934 births
Living people
South African cricketers
Border cricketers
People from Stutterheim
Cricketers from the Eastern Cape